Xylorycta cygnella is a moth in the family Xyloryctidae. It was described by Francis Walker in 1864. It is found in Australia, where it has been recorded from Western Australia.

The wingspan is about 21 mm. Adults are white, with the forewings rounded at the tips and pale brownish beneath. The costa and exterior border are hardly convex, the latter rather oblique.

References

Xylorycta
Moths described in 1864